The Septet in E major, Op. 65, was written by Camille Saint-Saëns between 1879 and 1880 for the unusual combination of trumpet, two violins, viola, cello, double bass and piano. Like the suites Opp. 16, 49, 90, the septet is a neoclassical work that revives 17th-century French dance forms, reflecting Saint-Saëns's interest in the largely forgotten French musical traditions of the 17th century.

History 

The septet is dedicated to Émile Lemoine, a mathematician who in 1861 founded the chamber music society La Trompette. Saint-Saëns and other well known musicians such as Louis Diémer, Martin Pierre Marsick, and Isidor Philipp would often perform at the concerts of the society, which took place at Salle Érard and later in the hall of the Horticultural Society. For many years, Lemoine had asked Saint-Saëns to compose a special piece with the trumpet to justify the name of the society, and jokingly he would respond that he could create a work for guitar and thirteen trombones. Saint-Saëns eventually relented, and in 1879 presented to Lemoine a piece titled Préambule as a Christmas present, later promising to complete the work with the Préambule as the first movement.

The complete septet was successfully premiered on 28 December 1880. The string quartet was doubled at the premiere – in Saint-Saëns' opinion, it made a stronger impact that way. The work was first published in March 1881 with Durand.

Structure 

The work consists of four movements, each around four minutes in length.

Legacy 
Hugo Wolf, who attended a performance of the septet in Vienna on 1 January 1887, wrote: "What was most engaging about this piece, distinguished by its skillful exploitation of the trumpet, was its brevity. A bit longer, and it would be a bore. This shrewd moderation and pithiness is admirable, and absolutely not to be underestimated. How many a German composer might envy Saint-Saëns this virtue!" Of Saint-Saëns's works, it was the septet that he reportedly liked most.

In October 1907, Saint-Saëns confessed to Lemoine: "When I think how much you pestered me to make me produce, against my better judgment, this piece that I did not want to write and which has become one of my great successes, I never understood why."

The septet was performed at Saint-Saëns' last public appearance as a pianist, shortly before his death, on the occasion of a celebration that Académie des Beaux-Arts members threw for him.

James Keller writes that the septet "stands as a curiosity of instrumentation that balances its forces with far greater success than one might anticipate. Portions of this appealing and entertaining work rank high on the scale of musical humor." Jeremy Nicholas has called the septet a neglected masterpiece, alongside the Piano Quartet and the First Violin Sonata.

Arrangements 
Numerous arrangements of the septet were made, including one for piano trio by Saint-Saëns himself (November 1881), and the Menuet and Gavotte for two pianos (August 1881). His pupil Gabriel Fauré arranged the work for piano duet (October 1881). Albert Périlhou made a concert transcription of the Gavotte (April 1886).

References

Notes

Sources

External links 

 , performed by members of the WDR Symphony Orchestra Cologne Orchesterakademie

Compositions for septet
Chamber music by Camille Saint-Saëns
1880 compositions
Compositions in E-flat major
Music with dedications